BBC Radio 1's Live Lounge 2018 is a compilation album consisting of live tracks played on Clara Amfo's BBC Radio 1 show, both cover versions and original songs. The album was released on 23 November 2018, and is the fourteenth in the series of Live Lounge albums. It debuted on the iTunes UK chart at #8.

Track listing

References 

2018 compilation albums
2018 live albums
Live Lounge
Covers albums
Rhino Entertainment compilation albums
Sony Music compilation albums
Universal Music Group compilation albums
Universal Music TV albums